Kinaxis is a supply chain management and sales and operation planning software company based in the Kanata district of Ottawa, Ontario, Canada. It is listed on the Toronto Stock Exchange and is a S&P/TSX Composite Component.

The company was founded in 1984 by Duncan Klett and two others as Cadence Computer Corporation and went public in June 2014.  It has 500 employees.

Business 
Kinaxis provides supply-chain-management software on a subscription basis, primarily to large, multinational companies.  Customers include Ford, Cisco, Qualcomm, and Avaya.  They also provide related professional services to their customers.  Contracts typically run for two to five years.  Their main product is called RapidResponse.  As of 2017, approximately 77% of revenue came from subscriptions, with the remainder from professional services.  Kinaxis also allows other companies, including Deloitte and Bain & Company, to install Kinaxis software for a percentage of the subscription revenues.  Kinaxis runs two data centers in South Korea. It has approximately 100 customers and about 5% of an estimated $4 billion market for software related to supply chain planning.  As of 2016, 85% of revenue was from US customers, 4% from Canadian customers, 8% from Asian customers, and the rest from European customers.  Competitors in the supply chain management software industry include SAP SE and JDA Software.  In 2017, a significant customer in Asia stopped paying, leading to a 3% reduction in revenue for the company.

History 
Kinaxis was founded in 1984 as Cadence Computer Corporation, to do supply-chain analysis of using custom mainframe computers, by three former Mitel engineers.  The name was later changed to Carp Systems International (after the nearby Carp River), then Enterprise Planning Systems.  In the mid 1990s, it changed its name to Webplan, and shifted from making hardware to providing software.

Recent history 
In 2000, it led a venture round that raised $33 million.  In 2005, it renamed itself Kinaxis, and started focusing on selling software by subscription, as opposed to collecting a one-time fee.  In June 2014, it held an IPO on the Toronto Stock Exchange, raising a total of $100 million.  Since then, its market capitalization has increased to $1.7 billion, as of August 2017. In 2022 they acquired MPO. MPO is Multi party Orchestration platform connecting Supply Chain actors.

References 

Online companies of Canada
Companies listed on the Toronto Stock Exchange
Companies based in Ottawa
Supply chain software companies
Information technology companies
Information technology companies of Canada
Canadian companies established in 1984
Software companies of Canada
Software companies established in 1984
1984 establishments in Ontario